Crimson & Clover is the sixth album by Tommy James and the Shondells. It features the #1 hit "Crimson and Clover" as well as the #2 hit "Crystal Blue Persuasion". The album "Crimson & Clover", was released in December 1968 and reached a peak of #8 on the Billboard 200.

Based on suggestions from radio stations the group chose to create an extended five-and-a-half minute long version of the title song for the album. The first two verses were copied without lead vocals, and then overdubbed with guitar solos by Shondells guitarist Ed Gray using steel guitars and fuzz guitars, as well as an extended one-minute wah-wah pedal finish. During tape copying a slight speed error was inadvertently introduced. This resulted in a small drop in pitch during the new guitar solo sections, which went unfixed.

The group had toured with Vice President Hubert Humphrey during his 1968 presidential campaign. Humphrey showed his appreciation by writing the liner notes for the Crimson and Clover album.

CD re-release

The version of Crimson and Clover on the 1991 "Crimson and Clover/Cellophane Symphony" CD is the same as the original album version; however, digital technology was used to fix the speed and pitch error mistake made in 1968. The CD booklet states that "Crimson and Clover" is now as it was "meant to be heard," and that Tommy James is "very satisfied" with the reissue of the recordings in CD format.

Track listing

Personnel
Adapted from AllMusic.

 Eddie Gray – guitar, background vocals
 Bill Inglot – engineer (CD remastering)
 Tommy James – lead vocals, guitar, keyboards, producer
 Peter Lucia – drums, percussion, background vocals
 Ken Perry – engineer (CD remastering)
 Ron Rosman –  keyboards, background vocals
 Michael Thom – liner notes
 Mike Vale – bass, background vocals

Charts
Album

Singles

References

External links
The Official Site of Tommy James and the Shondells

1969 albums
Tommy James and the Shondells albums
Roulette Records albums